"Castle on the Hill" is a song by English singer-songwriter Ed Sheeran. It was released on 6 January 2017 as one of the double lead singles from his third studio album ÷ (2017), along with "Shape of You". "Castle on the Hill" was written and produced by Ed Sheeran and Benny Blanco. The song refers to Framlingham Castle in Sheeran's home town of Framlingham in Suffolk, and reminisces tales of his upbringing in the town. The BBC states, "the song has been described as a love letter to Suffolk."

Released on the same day as "Shape of You", "Castle on the Hill" reached number one in Iceland, Scotland and 
Israel. The song also reached  number two in a number of countries, including the UK, Australia and Germany, while "Shape of You" debuted at number one. It was the first time in the history of the UK, Australian and German charts that an artist has taken the top two chart positions with new songs. The song debuted at number six in the US, while "Shape of You" entered at number one; this made Sheeran the first artist ever to have two songs simultaneously debut in the US top 10. "Castle" is certified nine-times Platinum in Australia, six-times Platinum in Canada, and multiplatinum in eight additional countries.

Background

The theme of the song surrounds Sheeran's home town of Framlingham, and he reminisces tales of 'smoking hand-rolled cigarettes' and getting 'drunk [with] friends' at this place, living life as a teenager. The castle mentioned in the song is Framlingham Castle, and in January 2017, Sheeran was invited to perform at the Castle.

The song was written and recorded in 2015. Sheeran revealed that despite a similarity to the music of U2, the direct influence of the song came from "Fallen Empires" by Snow Patrol, a band he had toured with. He said: "I grew up on Snow Patrol, I didn't grow up on U2, but I know that Snow Patrol grew up on U2, so I know [where] that influence had come [from]."  He also said he wanted to make a song like "The River" by Bruce Springsteen, a song with similar reflective element.

Critical reception
Jon Caramanica from The New York Times said, "'Castle on the Hill' has U2 influenced nervous guitar builds and wistful, largely generic lyrics about the people who shaped him." Billboards Taylor Weatherby wrote about the song saying, "'Castle on the Hill' has a Train like vibe with a fast-paced, yet powerful melody that builds to an epic chorus that's just as Sheeran as all of his past singles. Needless to say, Sheeran is telling the world he's back in compelling fashion." Jeremy Gordon of Spin gave the song a positive review, stating that the song "sort of sounds like late period Coldplay, big, broad stroke music for arenas and Wembley performances. There's a lyric about driving down a country road while listening to Elton John's hook-free 'Tiny Dancer,' because Ed Sheeran saw Almost Famous once." Adam Starkey from news website Metro states that it "'has echoes of Mumford & Sons with the kind of climbing drums and soaring chorus sure to win over festival crowds, recalling how far he's come from 'smoking hand-rolled cigarettes' and 'running from the law in the backfields'."

Chart performance
"Castle on the Hill" debuted at number two on the UK Singles Chart on 13 January, selling 193,000 combined units in its first week. Sheeran also debuted at number one with "Shape of You", making him the only artist in UK chart history to debut in the top two positions in the same week. The song was certified silver in the first week due to selling 200,000 units. The song remained at number two in its second week, selling 100,000 units. The song spent a further three weeks at number two, and spent fourteen weeks in the top ten altogether. As of September 2017, the song has sold 1.7 million combined units in the UK, 479,000 of these are actual sales, with 119 million streams. On the Scottish Singles Chart, "Castle on the Hill" debuted at number one, ahead of "Shape of You".

The song debuted at number six on the Billboard Hot 100, selling 171,000 downloads and gaining 13 million streams in its debut week in the US. Sheeran also became the first artist to debut two songs in the top 10 in the same week in the history of the Hot 100, with "Shape of You" also debuting at number one. As of September 2017, "Castle on the Hill" has sold 821,000 downloads in the US.

Music video

"Castle on the Hill" was accompanied by a lyric video on 5 January 2017 with "Shape of You" upon its release. By March 2018, it had amassed over 300 million views on YouTube.

The official music video for the song was released on 23 January 2017. It was directed by George Belfield and produced by Tom Gardner, and it features a group of adolescents living their youth with parallels being made to Sheeran's own youth. The video was filmed throughout Suffolk with locations including Framlingham, Boyton marshes, Mildenhall Stadium and Felixstowe. The final shot shows Framlingham Castle. Ed Sheeran stated on The Graham Norton Show that the young man playing him in the video went to the same school as Sheeran, Thomas Mills High School.

In popular culture
The song was used in trailers and several TV spots for the 2017 animated film Ferdinand.

The song is also used in the first trailer and a few TV spots for the 2019 animated film How to Train Your Dragon: The Hidden World.

The instrumental for the song was used in adverts for NHS careers in 2020.

Formats and track listings
Digital download
"Castle on the Hill" – 4:21

Digital download – Acoustic
"Castle on the Hill"  – 3:46

Digital download – Live at the BRITs
"Castle on the Hill"  – 1:47

German CD single
"Castle on the Hill" – 4:21
"Castle on the Hill"  – 3:46

Digital download – Seeb remix
 "Castle on the Hill"  – 3:51

Digital download – Throttle remix
 "Castle on the Hill" (Throttle remix) – 3:40

Digital download – NWYR remix

 "Castle on the Hill" (NWYR remix) – 3:33

Charts

Weekly charts

Year-end charts

Decade-end charts

Certifications

Release history

See also
 Lists of Scottish number-one singles of 2017

References

2017 singles
2017 songs
Ed Sheeran songs
Asylum Records singles
Atlantic Records singles
Framlingham
Number-one singles in Iceland
Number-one singles in Scotland
Pop ballads
Rock ballads
Songs about friendship
Songs about nostalgia
Songs about childhood
Songs about England
Songs based on actual events
Song recordings produced by Benny Blanco
Song recordings produced by Ed Sheeran
Songs written by Benny Blanco
Songs written by Ed Sheeran
Suffolk in fiction
2010s ballads
Folk ballads